The thirty-fifth series of the British medical drama television series Casualty began airing on BBC One in the United Kingdom on 2 January 2021. The series consists of 30 episodes, which focus on the professional and personal lives of medical and ancillary staff at the emergency department (ED) of the fictional Holby City Hospital. Loretta Preece continues her role as series producer. Sixteen regular cast members reprised their roles from the previous series and actor Michael Stevenson returned to the serial in episode fourteen as Iain Dean, a paramedic.

Production for the series began in September 2020 following a six-month hiatus in response to the COVID-19 pandemic. To protect cast and crew in the pandemic, new production protocols were implemented, including two-metre distancing at all times. This meant new filming techniques were used, including the use of plate shots and green screens. Costume and makeup also presented a challenge; personal protective equipment (PPE) became part of the costume, but face coverings did not as producers believed they limited emotion. Cast had to apply their own makeup and makeup-created injuries were stopped. Despite the reduction in other areas of production, stunts continued to be arranged as they were deemed integral to the format of the show and were often easier to arrange than swapping props.

The series explores the impact of the pandemic on ED staff and to truthfully portray the topic, discussions about how political Casualty could become occurred with Tim Davie, the Director-General of the BBC. Producers wanted the series to reflect the new landscape of the National Health Service (NHS). A special episode examining the pandemic in detail was commissioned as the series opener. Preece wanted the episode to do those closely impacted by the pandemic justice. The early series continues to explore the pandemic with a regular character dying from the virus and also progresses stories from the previous series.

Production 
The series commences in the United Kingdom on 2 January 2021 on BBC One and airs on Saturday nights. It was produced by BBC Studios. Loretta Preece continues her role as series producer. The series consists of 30 episodes. Production for series 35 commenced in September 2020, following a six-month hiatus after production was suspended in light of the COVID-19 pandemic. Consequently, the show took multiple transmission breaks during the previous series to spread episodes out across the year. Kate Oates, the head of continuing drama at BBC Studios, expressed her delight at resuming filming and to returning to transmission. Due to new techniques implemented in production, episode runtimes for the series were shortened from the usual 50 minutes to 40 minutes. Despite this, the opening episode airs for 54 minutes. Following new nationwide restrictions in November 2020, it was confirmed that Casualty would continue filming and would not pause production again.

Promotion 
The series was promoted through multiple trailers and each episode received a preview clip before broadcast. A promotional trailer for the series was released on 16 December 2020 and features segments from the early episodes of the series. As well as previewing new and continuing stories, the trailer revealed stunts featured in the series, including an exploded bomb and an ambulance crashing into a river. To further promote the new series, a Christmas-themed video of the cast, led by George Rainsford, was released on 17 December 2020. A mid-series trailer was released on 12 March 2021 featuring scenes from new and continuing stories. On 9 July 2021, Casualty released a promotional trailer for the final five episodes of the series. Megan Davies from Digital Spy thought the trailer was "action-packed" in the run up to an "explosive" series finale.

Filming 

Production protocols were enforced to maintain the safety of the cast and crew. Additionally, the physical distancing measures enforced by the British government were adhered to. The measures require cast and crew to maintain a two-metre distance at all times. Preece told Sophie Dainty of Digital Spy that this was challenging as the show works on "close contact medicine, stunts and emotional exchanges", which was hard to film while adhering to physical distancing measures. To maintain distancing in scenes with multiple characters, plate shots were filmed. Each shot includes different actors, stood distanced, and in post-production, the shots were edited together to make it appear like one shot. Green screens were also used to make actors appear closer together than they were allowed to be. Producer Mat McHale confirmed that the difference would not be noticeable on-screen. Preece reiterated this and promised that the show had not "comprised" on its quality as a result of changes to filming.

During production, producers faced a challenge of face masks, which are compulsory in hospitals. Preece believed that after much exploration, these masks limited the emotion of scenes, so they were not worn all the time. Since the drama is set in a hospital, characters used personal protective equipment (PPE) as part of their costume. To avoid using NHS resources, Casualty sourced their PPE from an alternative supplier and despite this, it maintains effectiveness, allowing them to occasionally breach the physical distancing measures. Due to the protocols enforced, cast were required to apply their own makeup with verbal support from the makeup artists. The show regularly uses makeup-created injuries, such as cuts and bruises, but this was stopped due to the new protection measures. Additionally, to film kissing scenes, the show hired the partners of the actors to be body doubles. Oates was keen to not stop the stunts involved in the drama as she believed they were integral to its formula. Preece revealed that much "planning and innovative thinking" had gone into the stunts, ensuring that the show's "trademark stunts" were unaltered. Oates and Preece agreed that often, stunts were easier to arrange than swapping props, due to the time and money involved in them.

Storyline development 
Series 35 explores the impact of the COVID-19 pandemic on staff in emergency departments, maintaining the drama's tradition of "[reflecting] the difficult realities of the NHS". Preece felt it was hard to reflect the pandemic from a planning perspective as they could not predict the impact it had on EDs. To accommodate the new stories, all pre-existing scripts were scrapped and the pre-planned stories were rewritten. Oates explained that the decision was taken as the previous material "[would not] have felt relevant". Oates was pleased to portray stories which "reflect the extraordinary times we are living through". She entered discussions with Tim Davie, the Director-General of the BBC, about how political Casualty could be about the pandemic, as it is one of his concerns; he permitted in-character political statements. Oates was pleased with this as she did not believe the show could be "truthful" without that and also feared it could make the show "boring". She wanted the show to reflect new landscape of the NHS and hoped that it would spark new topical conversations. She commented, "Hopefully, on shows like ours, we can make those social points at the same time as our heroes are seen in their best Avengers style embracing the same kind of life-or-death situations they always have."

A special episode examining the pandemic in detail was commissioned to open the series. The episode is billed as "one of [Casualty] most powerful episodes to date" and explores clinical lead Connie Beauchamp (Amanda Mealing) managing the department with support from senior nurses Jacob Masters (Charles Venn) and Charlie Fairhead (Derek Thompson), consultant Will Noble (Jack Nolan) becoming disillusioned with the NHS, and paramedic Fenisha Khatri (Olivia D'Lima) trying to protect her unborn baby. The episode is set between March and summer 2020, across the first wave of the pandemic. The episode was announced on 7 September 2020, with further details, including a promotional image, released on 10 December 2020. The story team worked with medical advisors to accurately portray the experiences of medics and front-line workers. Venn felt it was vital to reflect the pandemic through this episode. He told Joe Anderton of Digital Spy, "It would be remiss of us not to acknowledge that. I don't want to say we are paying homage, but for everyone who has lost loved ones during this time, it was a must. It would be very strange to ignore it." He dubbed the episode "a real tearjerker and a real rollercoaster". Preece was proud of the episode and felt it was important to showcase the impact on EDs. She commented, "We knew we had to do medics, COVID victims and survivors and their relations justice and I strongly believe that we have."

Writers concluded and progressed stories from the previous series. This occurs in early episodes, which were set in summer and autumn 2020. Preece noted that this allows Casualty to continue exploring stories including Fenisha's pregnancy, a love triangle between Dylan Keogh (William Beck), Faith Cadogan (Kirsty Mitchell) and Lev Malinovsky (Uriel Emil), and Connie and Jacob's romance. She added that writers wanted to explore the complications of Fenisha's pregnancy due to the baby's father, Ethan Hardy (George Rainsford), having Huntington's disease. Other stories further explored from the previous series are Charlie's grief, following the death of his wife, and nurse Jade Lovall's (Gabriella Leon) deafness. The latter was explored in a special episode in the previous series with focus moving to the challenges of lip reading with PPE and masks in this series.

Producers made the pandemic a recurring theme throughout the rest of the series, but were keen for it to not dominate stories. On this, Preece commented that Casualty "offers the audience a slice of Saturday night escapism". Mealing added that the audience have lived through it and do not want to revisit it weekly. In the series, the health impacts of COVID-19 were explored through the characters of Jacob and Dylan, who both contract the virus. Noel Garcia (Tony Marshall), a receptionist in the ED, also contracts the virus and is killed off, making it the first episode of a soap in the United Kingdom to portray the death of a character from the virus. Preece thought that his death would be "impactful" and felt it reflected those who have died from the virus: they all "have been treasured by colleagues and [...] have families who love them". While the death of a regular character had been announced prior to transmission, Marshall's departure had been embargoed. Writers used the character's death to set up new stories. Mealing explained that her character Connie would take "personal responsibility" for the death and would struggle in the aftermath, viewing it as "her failing".

The show's story team also created new stories for the series. One story focuses on "new territory" for paramedic Jan Jenning (Di Botcher) and her police officer wife Ffion Morgan (Stirling Gallacher). A new plot was also created for nurse Marty Kirkby (Shaheen Jafargholi), billed by Preece as different from his other stories. The story explores the issue of pelvic mesh implants through the character of Marty's mother, Bibi Kirkby (Fisun Burgess), after she has vaginal mesh surgery. Marty feels that the private clinic who operated on Bibi have "betrayed" her. Scriptwriters requested the help of Kate Sansom, from the campaign group Sling the Mesh, for the storyline. She expressed her gratitude that Casualty were covering the subject and felt the show could help raise further awareness. A show spokesman confirmed the story is not based on real-life events and that the research team had worked with "a range of experts and medical advisers" to ensure the story was portrayed sensitively. A story for the character of Jade began mid-series when she is spiked and attacked on a night out. She is "traumatised" by the event and questions whether she was targeted because of her disability. Leon found the plot challenging to film and hoped that it would raise awareness about drink-spiking and the spiker being the issue behind it.

Plans for the series finale were first teased by Rainsford in an April 2021 interview with Digital Spy Sophie Dainty. He explained that the episode would include stunts and described it as "one of those big Casualty ensemble pieces with an event which pulls together lots of the cast". The episode builds towards the next series, which celebrates the serial's thirty-fifth anniversary.

Cast 
The thirty-fifth series of Casualty features a cast of characters working for the NHS within the emergency department of Holby City Hospital and the Holby Ambulance Service. Most cast members from the previous series reprise their roles in this series. William Beck appears as Dylan Keogh, a consultant in emergency medicine, while Di Botcher portrays Jan Jenning, the operational duty manager at Holby Ambulance Service. Olivia D'Lima stars as Fenisha Khatri, a paramedic, and Jason Durr features as David Hide, a senior staff nurse. Uriel Emil plays paramedic Lev Malinovsky, and Amanda Henderson appears as staff nurse Robyn Miller. Shaheen Jafargholi and Gabriella Leon reprise their roles as staff nurses Marty Kirkby and Jade Lovall, respectively. Tony Marshall features as Noel Garcia, a receptionist, and Amanda Mealing portrays Connie Beauchamp, the department's clinical lead and a consultant in emergency medicine. Kirsty Mitchell stars as Faith Cadogan, an advanced clinical practitioner (ACP), and Neet Mohan appears as Rash Masum, a F1 doctor. Jack Nolan portrays Will Noble, a consultant in pediatric emergency medicine, and George Rainsford plays consultant Ethan Hardy. Original cast member Derek Thompson appears as Charlie Fairhead, a senior charge nurse and emergency nurse practitioner. Charles Venn stars as Jacob Masters, the department's clinical nurse manager. Additionally, three cast members feature in a recurring capacity: Harry Collett appears as Oliver Hide, the son of David, Stirling Gallacher plays Ffion Morgan, a police officer, and Jacey Sallés portrays Rosa Cadenas, a healthcare assistant.

Mealing confirmed on 24 December 2020 that a regular character would be killed off in the opening episode after contracting coronavirus. The episode features the death of Noel, whose identity was embargoed until transmission. Preece called Marshall, who has appeared in the show since 2008, "a much loved member of the behind-the-scenes Casualty family" and expressed her sadness at the character's death. She added that many people cried when filming Marshall's final scenes and that he would be missed. Nolan's departure from the series was revealed on 31 December 2020, and Will departs in the third episode. In March 2021, it was confirmed that at Mealing's request, Connie would depart the series, after a seven-year stint. The exit was reported to be a temporary break. Mealing expressed her delight at playing Connie and felt that the character was revolutionary for women. Deborah Sathe, the senior head of content production at BBC Studios, praised Connie and Mealing, in particular for her work following the show's return to filming. Connie departs in the thirteenth episode after deciding to be closer to her daughter in America.

The casting of actor Bobby Lockwood in the role of paramedic Leon Cook was announced on 16 December 2020. He is billed as "handsome, charming, loveable" whose "endless excitement" can cause tension with some colleagues. Lockwood expressed his pride at representing front line workers in his role. Preece was pleased with Lockwood's casting and liked the character. She opined that both Lockwood and Leon have "the most extraordinary comic timing". Leon first appears in the second episode. In April 2021, it was confirmed that the character would leave the series; he departs in episode 17. Leon departs after failing to secure a permanent position at the ambulance service. Preece thanked Lockwood for his work and suggested that the character could return in the future. On 20 May 2021, it was announced that Osi Okerafor had been cast as Matthew Afolami, an experienced locum registrar. His backstory states that he was in a relationship with Fenisha, which creates drama in her ongoing romance with Ethan. Okerafor liked his character's patient care. Preece was pleased to have Okerafor, who she described as "handsome and debonair, sensitive and steadfast, passionate and unpredictable", join the cast. She added that the actor's "beautifully layered" performance created a character who is "far more than a classic romantic leading man". Matthew first appears in episode 22.

Preece confirmed that multiple former cast members would return to Casualty during the series. She expressed her delight at the returns and revealed that one return would "[come] from a very unexpected direction". Emily Carey reprises her recurring role as Grace Beauchamp-Strachan, the daughter of Connie, in the series. Her return was confirmed in a promotional trailer released on 16 December 2020. The character last appeared in series 32. Preece said that Grace returns "beautiful and forthright" with a wish to be "appreciated" by Connie. She also expressed her delight at Carey's return and looked forward to exploring her character's new stories. Grace returns in episode 7, and departs alongside Mealing in episode 13. On 17 December 2020, it was announced that actor Michael Stevenson had reprised his role as paramedic Iain Dean, following his departure in the previous series. Stevenson expressed his delight and looked forward to exploring stories for Iain. The character returns in episode 14. After a guest stint in the previous series, actress Adele James returned in episode five as Tina Mollett, an agency nurse. She becomes involved in a relationship with Jacob. James' agent confirmed that she had been promoted to the regular cast. The return of Ciaran Coulson, portrayed by Rick Warden, was announced on 12 March 2021. Warden played Ciaran in series 33. The character is reintroduced in episode nineteen as part of Marty's story. It emerges that he is the chief executive officer (CEO) of the private health clinic which Marty is taking to court.

The series features several recurring characters and multiple guest stars. It was announced on 3 February 2020 that Chris Gordon would reprise his role as Ross West, the son of Jan, as part of "a huge and terrifying story" involving the character and Ffion. He returns in episode nine, and departs in episode seventeen. In October 2020, Gallacher revealed, via Twitter, that comedian Rosie Jones would guest star in an episode of the series. She portrays patient Paula Kettering. Preece confirmed that she would appear in the ninth episode and the role would showcase a "whole new side" of Jones. She added that her character would appear with Jan. Lollie McKenzie reprised her guest role as Natalia Malinovsky, the daughter of Faith and Lev, in episode two. Mitchell confirmed that Natalia would return as part of a bigger story in the series. McKenzie appeared again in episode twelve. Episode five features an appearance from Philip Wright as Graham Kirkby, the father of Marty. He has appeared on a recurring basis since series 33. Kriss Dosanjh reprises his role in episode 13 as Rash's father, Ashok Masum; he previously appeared in series 34. Graham returns in the fifteenth episode, alongside Marty's mother, Bibi Kirkby, who is portrayed by Fisun Burgess. The character previously appeared in series 33, played by Badria Timimi.

Main characters 

 William Beck as Dylan Keogh
 Di Botcher as Jan Jenning
 Olivia D'Lima as Fenisha Khatri
 Jason Durr as David Hide
 Uriel Emil as Lev Malinovsky
 Amanda Henderson as Robyn Miller
 Shaheen Jafargholi as Marty Kirkby
 Adele James as Christina "Tina" Mollett
 Gabriella Leon as Jade Lovall
 Bobby Lockwood as Leon Cook
 Tony Marshall as Noel Garcia
 Amanda Mealing as Connie Beauchamp
 Kirsty Mitchell as Faith Cadogan
 Neet Mohan as Rash Masum
 Jack Nolan as Will Noble
 Osi Okerafor as Matthew Afolami
 George Rainsford as Ethan Hardy
 Michael Stevenson as Iain Dean
 Derek Thompson as Charlie Fairhead
 Charles Venn as Jacob Masters

Recurring characters 

 Emily Carey as Grace Beauchamp-Strachan
 Harry Collett as Oliver Hide
 Stirling Gallacher as Ffion Morgan
 Lollie McKenzie as Natalia Malinovsky
 Jacey Sallés as Rosa Cadenas
 Rick Warden as Ciaran Coulson

Guest characters 

 Fisun Burgess as Bibi Kirkby
 Chris Gordon as Ross West
 Kriss Dosanjh as Ashok Masum
 Rosie Jones as Paula Kettering
 Philip Wright as Graham Kirkby
 Leslie Ash as Vanessa Lytton

Episodes

References

Footnotes

External links 
 Casualty series 35 at BBC Online
 Casualty series 35 at the Internet Movie Database

35
2021 British television seasons
Cultural responses to the COVID-19 pandemic
Media depictions of the COVID-19 pandemic in the United Kingdom